Albano Lugli (Carpi, 13 November 1834 – Carpi, 8 August 1914) was an Italian painter and ceramic artist mainly active in his native Carpi, painting historic and sacred subjects.

Biography
He trained in the Arts School led by Claudio Rossi in Carpi, then attended the Academy of Arts in Modena from 1849 to 1867, where he trained under Luigi Asioli. Among his first public works, from 1860, was painting the oval music hall in the Communal Theater of Carpi, in a style reminiscent of the Renassaince master Correggio. In the future, his style would acquire the flair of pittura di macchia (painting of dots) which was less linear, and using broad, rapid, thick brushstrokes.

In 1867, he moves to Florence on a scholarship; there he works with Enrico Pollastrini, professor at the Academy of Fine Arts, who stressed the copying of old masters as the road to skill. He returns to Carpi in 1870, where he painted the Proclamation of the Dogma of the Immaculate Conception in the left apse of the transept of the church of San Nicolò. In Reggio Emilia he painted in the Cathedral of the Assumption, and in churches of San Francesco and San Bernardino. He also produced some altarpieces including a Sacred Conversation for San Biagio in Palude. He also painted in the church of San Nicola di Bari, Sestola. He also helped decorate palaces in Carpi, including the ceiling of the Villa Pallotti.

Among other works are: Giottino che disegna una pecora; Lorenzo Ghiberti in atto di raccogliere consigli dagli amici sul progetto delle porte del Battistero; and Ariosto in Carpi with Alberto Pio<ref>L'Ariosto a Carpi presso Alberto Pio is presently found at the Museo Civico of Carpi at Palazzo dei Pio .</ref> At the Accademia di Modena was found his painting: Cactas cries on the tomb of Atala''. He painted many portraits including one of Pietro Giannone. He was professor of the Royal Academy of Modena, and member of many other Academies of Fine Arts.

Sources

1834 births
1914 deaths
Artists from Carpi, Emilia-Romagna
19th-century Italian painters
Italian male painters
20th-century Italian painters
20th-century Italian male artists
19th-century Italian male artists